Caleb Zagi (born October 1960) was elected Senator for Kaduna South constituency of Kaduna State, Nigeria, taking office on 29 May 2007. He was a member of the People's Democratic Party (PDP).

Zagi obtained a master's degree in business administration. 
He was elected to the House Of Representatives in 2003, holding office until 2007.
He won the PDP nomination as senatorial candidate for the southern zone of Kaduna, but in January 2007 came under intense pressure to hand over his ticket to the incumbent senator Isaiah Balat, and to run on the deputy governor's ticket of the party. Zagi refused to yield the ticket, and was elected.

References

Living people
1960 births
People from Kaduna State
Peoples Democratic Party members of the Senate (Nigeria)
Members of the House of Representatives (Nigeria)
21st-century Nigerian politicians